This is a list of newspapers in Chile.

Print newspapers

Daily circulation

National circulation
{|class="wikitable sortable"
! Newspaper
! City
! Founded
! Publisher
! Notes
|-
| El Mercurio
| Santiago
| 1 June 1900
| El Mercurio S.A.P.
| Conservative morning daily; considered the country's paper of record
|-
| La Tercera
| Santiago
| 7 July 1950
| Copesa
| Conservative morning daily; El Mercurio'''s closest competitor
|-
| Diario Financiero| Santiago
| 25 October 1988
| Grupo Claro
| Conservative; EyN of El Mercurio and Pulso 's closest competitor
|-
| La Segunda| Santiago
| 29 July 1931
| El Mercurio S.A.P.
| Conservative afternoon daily
|-
| Las Últimas Noticias| Santiago
| 15 November 1902
| El Mercurio S.A.P.
| Tabloid
|-
| La Cuarta| Santiago
| 13 November 1984
| Copesa
| Tabloid
|}

 Publimetro
 The Clinic – Left-wing Satirical weekly

Regional circulation
Valparaíso Region
 El Mercurio de Valparaíso (Valparaíso)

O'Higgins Region
 El Rancagüino (Rancagua)

Maule Region
 La Prensa (Curicó)

Biobío Region
 El Sur (Concepción)

Araucanía Region
 Las Noticias (Victoria)

Los Ríos Region
 El Diario Austral de Los Ríos (Valdivia)

Aysén Region
 El Divisadero (Coihaique)

Non-daily newspapers

National circulationCambio 21Regional circulation
O'Higgins Region
 El Faro del Secano (Pichilemu)
 La Voz de la Región (Pichilemu)

Valparaíso Region
 Te Rapa Nui (Easter Island)
 moeVarua Rapa Nui (Easter Island) 

Online newspapers
O'Higgins Region 
 El Expreso de la Costa (Pichilemu)
 El Marino (Pichilemu) 

Los Ríos Region
 El Naveghable

Valparaíso Region
 El Correo del Moai (Easter Island)

Defunct newspapers
 Aurora de Chile – first daily of Chile
 Pichilemu'' (Pichilemu)

See also
List of Chilean magazines
 Television in Chile

References

Further reading

External links
 
 

Newspapers
Chile